Ben Yeo Chi Lung is a Singaporean actor and television host.

Career
A former model, Yeo was first scouted on Snap, SPH MediaWorks Channel U's talent show. He won the competition and was signed by SPH MediaWorks. When MediaWorks merged MediaCorp in 2005, he was one of a number of artistes transferred over.

Yeo has gotten 2 Top 10 Most Popular Male Artistes from 2012, 2017 respectively.

Personal life
Yeo's ancestry can be traced back to Zhaoan, Fujian. He has two older sisters and an older brother.

Yeo is married to Claudia Cheong and they have two sons.

Outside of acting, Yeo is a passionate cook who regularly posts livestreams of his cooking on his Facebook page. He has also opened a number of eateries and restaurants, with his first venture dating back to 2013.

Filmography

Variety shows

Awards and nominations

References

External links
Profile on xin.msn.com
Profile on MediaCorp TV

Singaporean male television actors
Singaporean television personalities
Living people
Singaporean people of Hokkien descent
1978 births